Skeletal Radiology is a peer-reviewed medical journal published by Springer Science+Business Media, covering disorders of the musculoskeletal system, including the spine. It is the official journal of The International Skeletal Society.

Abstracting and indexing
The journal is abstracted and indexed in Current Contents/Clinical Medicine, EMBASE, PASCAL, PubMed/Medline, Science Citation Index, and Scopus. According to the Journal Citation Reports, the journal has a 2016 impact factor of 1.737.

References

External links
 
 International Skeletal Society

Springer Science+Business Media academic journals
Monthly journals
Publications established in 1976
English-language journals
Radiology and medical imaging journals
Orthopedics journals